Events in the year 1859 in Portugal.

Incumbents
Monarch: Pedro V 
President of the Council of Ministers: Nuno José Severo de Mendoça Rolim de Moura Barreto, 1st Duke of Loulé (until 16 March), António José Severim de Noronha, 1st Duke of Terceira (from 16 March)

Births
 1 January - Henrique Pousão, painter (died 1884)
 21 September - António Maria de Sousa Horta e Costa,  nobleman, jurist, magistrate, politician (died 1931)
 Jaime de Magalhães Lima, philosopher, poet, writer (died 1936)

Deaths
 17 January - Francisco de Melo da Gama de Araújo e Azevedo, field marshal, governor of Diu in Portuguese India (born 1773)
 Honório Barreto, governor of Portuguese Guinea (born 1813)

See also
List of colonial governors in 1859#Portugal

References

 
Portugal
Years of the 19th century in Portugal
Portugal